SCOMBA (Sistema de COMbate de los Buques de la Armada; meaning "Spanish Navy's ship's combat system") is a unified combat system that equips the majority of Spanish naval vessels since 2010. It is a variant of the Aegis combat system.

History 

SCOMBA is a Spanish national version of the Aegis combat system evolved from a technology transfer, including lines of source code included in the  program, this includes commonality with the C&D (Command and Decision) and ADS (Aegis Display System) of the US Navy version, with the aim of unifying in a common core all future Spanish Navy combat systems sharing source code, specifications, interface, equipment and training all without a external support.

General characteristics 

The hardware is composed of two redundant ARES processing units, a variable amount of CONAM terminals, two or three monitors, a digital video TV and radar server (SD2V), a variable amount of large display screens linked to a wide range of sensors.
During the development of SCOMBA the following sensors where integrated among others:
 LANZA-N radar from Indra Sistemas.
 ARIES radar from Indra.
 IFF with mode 5 and mode S.
 PAR Approach radar (based on the ARIES radar).
 DORNA naval radar and optronic fire direction developed by Navantia.
 RIGEL countermeasure suite.
 AIS as a sensor of the combat system.
 LINPRO processor built by Tecnobit, with a common type N interface.
 Amphibious assault craft control system.
 Integration with a common maps archive.
 NTP synchronization.

References 

Command and control
Spanish Navy